The Historic Shipwrecks Act 1976 was an Act of the Parliament of Australia which legally protected historic shipwrecks and any relics or artefacts from those wrecks.

The Act 
The Act automatically affects all shipwrecks that meet the "historic" criteria (generally defined as vessels more than 75 years old, although newer ships with historic value may be placed under the Act) and are in Australian Commonwealth waters (between the low-tide mark and the edge of the continental shelf): complementary state and territory legislation protects shipwrecks in state and territory waters including rivers and bays. Of the estimated 8,000 shipwrecks in Australian waters, more than 6,500 are protected under this legislation.

Most shipwrecks under the act can be accessed by the public, although no items may be removed from the wreck site without permission, and divers must take care not to damage or disturb the wreck. Any items removed from a protected wreck (including those removed before the Act came into effect) must be listed on a database maintained by the Federal department responsible for maintaining and preserving Australia's cultural heritage (the Department of the Environment and Energy). As of 2011, over 500,000 artefacts and relics are listed and recognised. Anyone disturbing a protected shipwreck can be fined up to A$10,000, or imprisoned for a maximum of five years. 

The Act was repealed by the provision of assent  on 24 August 2018 to the Underwater Cultural Heritage Act 2018 which  commenced on 1 July 2019.

Historic shipwreck protected zones
Shipwrecks can be placed within an exclusion zone with a radius up to  where there can be no activities in or through this zone without formal permission.  The following historic shipwrecks lie within protected or no-entry zones declared under the Act:

 Aarhus
 SS Alert
 Bega
 Cato
 AHS Centaur
 Clonmel
 SMS Emden
 Foam
Florence D
 SS Glenelg
 SS Gothenburg
 HSK Kormoran
 Lady Darling
Llewellyn
 Submarine M24
 HMCS Mermaid

Sanyo Maru 
 Submarine I-124
 HMAS Sydney
 SS Yongala
 VOC Zuytdorp

Complementary legislation
The following legislation complements the Act within waters under the direct control of the States and the Northern Territory: 

 New South Wales: Heritage Act 1977 
 Northern Territory: Heritage Conservation Act 1991
 Queensland: Queensland Heritage Act 1992 
 South Australia: Historic Shipwrecks Act 1981 and Heritage Places Act 1993
 Tasmania: Historic Cultural Heritage Act 1995
 Victoria: Heritage Act 1995 and Heritage Historic Shipwrecks General Regulations 1996
 Western Australia: Maritime Archaeology Act 1973

See also
ANCODS
 Australasian Underwater Cultural Heritage Database

References

External links
 Historic Shipwrecks Act 1976

Shipwreck law
Repealed Acts of the Parliament of Australia
1976 in Australian law